The Somali Region, also known as Soomaali Galbeed and officially the Somali Regional State, is a regional state in eastern Ethiopia. Its territory is the largest after Oromia Region. The regional state borders the Ethiopian regions of Afar and Oromia and the chartered city Dire Dawa to the west, as well as Djibouti to the north, Somaliland to the northeast, Somalia to the south; and Kenya to the southwest.

Jijiga is the capital of the Somali Region. The capital was formerly Gode, until Jijiga became the capital in 1995 on account of political considerations.

The Somali regional government is composed of the executive branch, led by the President; the legislative branch, which comprises the State Council; and the judicial branch, which is led by the State Supreme Court.

Overview 
The Somali Region formed a large part of the pre-1995 provinces of Hararghe, Bale and Sidamo. The population is predominantly Somali, and there have been attempts to incorporate the area into a Greater Somalia. In the 1970s, Somalia, supported by the United States, invaded Ethiopia, igniting the Ogaden War, which Somalia lost due to timely military intervention from the Soviet Union and its ally Cuba. Despite this defeat, local groups still tried either to become part of Somalia or independent.

The 2007 Abole oil field raid, in which 72 Chinese and Ethiopian oilfield workers were killed, has led to a series of military reprisals against the rebel group ONLF Ogaden National Liberation Front.

Until its first-ever district elections in February 2004, Zonal and woreda administrators and village chairmen were appointed by the Regional government. Senior politicians at the Regional level nominated their clients to the local government positions. In the 2004 local elections, each woreda elected a council including a spokesman, vice-spokesman, administrator, and vice-administrator. These councils have the responsibility of managing budgets and development activities within their respective districts.

Demographics 

Based on the 2007 Census conducted by the Central Statistical Agency of Ethiopia (CSA), the Somali Region has a total population of 7,445,219, consisting of 3,472,490 men and 3,972,729 women; urban inhabitants number 1,489,044 or 20% of the population, a further 5,956,175 or 80% were pastoralists and farmers. With an estimated area of 327,068 square kilometers, this region has an estimated density of 20.9 people per square kilometer. For the entire region 1, 685,986 households were counted, which results in an average for the Region of 6.8 persons to a household, with urban households having on average 6 and rural households 6.5 people. 

There are 8 refugee camps and 1 transit center, housing 212,967 refugees from Somalia, located in Somali Region.

In the previous census, conducted in 1994, the region's population was reported to be 3,383,165, of which Somalis made up 3,236,667. There were 1,846,417 were males and  1,537,748 were females. The urban residents of the Somali Region numbered 492,710 households, with an average of 6.6 persons per household; a high sex ratio of 120 males to 100 females was reported. As of 1997, the ethnic composition of the Region was 95.67% Somali, 0.70% Amhara, 2.25% Oromo; all other ethnic groups made up 1.38% of the population. 

According to the CSA, 38.98% of the total population had access to safe drinking water, of whom 21.32% were rural inhabitants and 77.21% were urban. Values for other reported common indicators of the standard of living for Somali  include the following: 71.8% of the inhabitants fall into the lowest wealth quintile; adult literacy for men is 22% and for women 9.8%; and the Regional infant mortality rate is 57 infant deaths per 1,000 live births, which is less than the nationwide average of 77; at least half of these deaths occurred in the infants’ first month of life.

The region is home to almost all major Somali clan families. The Issa and Gadabuursi subclans of the Dir primarily inhabit the northern Sitti zone and the Awbare woreda in Fafan zone.

The Habr Awal, Garhajis, Habr Je'lo and Arap clans of the Isaaq clan family inhabit the northern part of the region bordering Somaliland, with the Habr Awal making up the majority in Harshin woreda as well as making up a significant portion of the population of the Kebribeyah woreda, as well as the lucrative border town of Tog Wajaale. The Garhajis and Habr Je'lo make up the majority of Awaare and Misrak Gashamo woredas in Jarar zone with a significant presence in the Danot woreda.

Subclans of the Hawiye inhabit the western and southern areas of the region, with the Degodia being the majority in Liben and also having a large presence in Afder, Dollo, Jarar and Jijiga and other zones. Karanle and Sheekhaal are present in the western areas bordering the Oromia region and the Hawadle and Habar Gidir subclans are present in the Shabelle zone. The closely related Samaale subclan of Garre are also present in the Liben zone and Dawa zone where they make up the majority. 

Various subclans of the Darod clan family primarily inhabit the central and eastern parts of the region, with the Ogaden and Jidwaq inhabiting the interior as well as the major towns of Jijiga, Gode, Kebridehar. The Harti as well as the Leelkase clans inhabit the Dollo zone where they make up the majority while the Marehan clan inhabit the Shilavo woreda and the Liben zone.

Languages 
Somali as a primary language is spoken by 95.89% of the inhabitants. All other languages spoken together make up 4.11%.

Religion 
98.74% of the population are Muslim, All other religions together made up 1.26%.

Agriculture 

The CSA of Ethiopia estimated in 2005 that farmers in the Somali Region had a total of 1,459,720 cattle (representing 10.19%% of Ethiopia's total cattle), 1,463,000 sheep (20.66%), 1,650,970 goats (50.02%), 1,291,550 donkeys (30.66%), 5,3165,260 camels (96.2%), 154,670 poultry of all species (0.5%), and 5,330 beehives (0.12%). For nomadic inhabitants, the CSA provided two sets of estimates, one based on aerial surveys and the other on more conventional methodology:

Transportation

Ground travel
West from Addis Ababa, Awash 572 km via Harar and Jijiga to Degehabur

Air travel
Somali Regional State has 3 international airport and 2 commercial airports. The international airports are Jijiga Airport, Gode Airport, and Kabri Dar Airport, The 2 commercial airports are Dolo Airport, and Shilavo Airport.

Government

Executive branch
The executive branch is headed by the Chief Administrator of Somali Regional State. The current Chief Administrator is Mustafa Muhummed Omer (Cagjar), elected on 22 August 2018. A Vice President of Somali Region succeeds the president in the event of any removal from office, and performs any duties assigned by the president. The current vice president is Adam Farah Ibrahim. The other offices in the executive branch cabinet are the Regional Health Bureau, Educational Bureau, and 18 other officials.

List of Chief Administrators of Somali Region

Judicial branch 
There are three levels of the Somali region judiciary. The lowest level is the court of common pleas: each woreda maintains its own constitutionally mandated court of common pleas, which maintain jurisdiction over all justiciable matters. The intermediate-level court system is the district court system. Four courts of appeals exist, each retaining jurisdiction over appeals from common pleas, municipal, and county courts in an administrative zone. A case heard in this system is decided by a three-judge panel, and each judge is elected.

The highest-ranking court, the Somali Supreme Court, is Somali's "court of last resort". A Seven-justice panel composes the court, which, by its own discretion, hears appeals from the courts of appeals, and retains original jurisdiction over limited matters. The chief judge is called the Chief of Soamli Supreme Court Abdullahi Saed Omar.

Legislative branch 
The State Council, which is the highest administrative body of the state, is made up of 269 members.

National politics 
Somali is represented by
  6 representatives in The House of Federation (upper chamber) and
 24 representatives in The House of Peoples' Representatives (lower chamber)

Administrative zones
Like other Regions in Ethiopia, Somali Region is subdivided into eleven administrative zones and Six Special administrative zones:

 Afder Zone
 Dollo Zone (formerly Warder)
 Erer Zone
 Fafan Zone (formerly Jigjiga)
 Jarar Zone (formerly Degehabur)
 Korahe Zone
 Liben Zone
 Dhawa Zone
 Nogob Zone (formerly Fiq)
 Shabelle Zone (formerly Godey)
 Sitti Zone (formerly Shinile)
 Degehabur Special Zone (special zone)
 Gode Special Zone (special zone)
 Harawo Special Zone (special zone)
 Kebri Beyah Special Zone (special zone)
 Tog Wajale Special Zone (special zone)

The zones are themselves subdivided into districts.

See also 
 Afar-Somali clashes
 List of airports in Ethiopia

References

Further reading 
 Tobias Hagmann, "Beyond clannishness and colonialism: understanding political disorder in Ethiopia's Somali Region, 1991- 2004", Journal of Modern African Studies, 43 (2005), 509–536.
 Abdi Ismail Samatar (2004): "Ethiopian Federalism: Autonomy versus Control in the Somali Region". Third World Quarterly, Vol. 25/6
 John Markakis (1996): "The Somali in Ethiopia". Review of African Political Economy, Vol. 23, No. 70, pp. 567–570
 John Markakis (1994): "Briefing: Somalia in the New Political Order of Ethiopia". Review of African Political Economy, Vol. 21, No. 59 pp. 71–79

External links
Map of Somali Region at UN-OCHA
Map of Somali Region at DPPA of Ethiopia (PDF file)
 List of Ogaden-Somali Members of Ethiopian Parliament
 Official Website of Ogaden-Somali region of Ethiopia
"Ethiopia: Rains pound Somali region as death toll rises" - UN IRIN
"Floods plague Horn of Africa, wash away refugee shelters" - UN News

 
1994 establishments in Ethiopia
Regions of Ethiopia
Somali-speaking countries and territories
States and territories established in 1992